The Ministerial Diary Secretary or simply Diary Secretary is a role in the private office of United Kingdom government ministers. Sometimes also called a Diary Manager, the role involves organising a Minister's calendar of meetings and visits and sometimes arranging associated written briefing from relevant officials. The role is differentiated from (and more junior than) a Private Secretary, who is responsible for policy support to the Minister and management of the Private Office.

References

Government of the United Kingdom
Government occupations